John Schappert (November 1853 – July 27, 1917 in Brooklyn, New York) was a 19th-century professional baseball pitcher.  Schappert pitched for the St. Louis Brown Stockings during the 1882 season.  He pitched in 15 games, including 14 starts, and finished with a record of 8 wins and 7 losses.

External links

1917 deaths
St. Louis Brown Stockings (AA) players
19th-century baseball players
1853 births
Harrisburg (minor league baseball) players
Reading Actives players
Rochester Flour Cities players
Syracuse Stars (minor league baseball) players
Bradford (minor league baseball) players